"Corazón" (English: "Heart") is a song performed by Ricky Martin, included on his album, A Medio Vivir (1995). It was released as a single in Finland on October 27, 1997, after the success of "Maria".

The song peaked at number twenty on The Official Finnish Charts.

"Corazon" was remixed for the single release by Finnish record producer, JS16. He gained fame by being the producer of the Finnish rap/electro group, Bomfunk MC's.

Formats and track listings
Finnish CD single
"Corazón" (Samba Remix)
"Corazón" (Radio Remix) – 4:06

Finnish CD maxi-single
"Corazón" (Samba Remix)
"Corazón" (Radio Remix) – 4:06
"Corazón" (Extended Remix)
"Corazón" (Original Album Version) – 4:20

Charts

References

1997 singles
Ricky Martin songs
Spanish-language songs
Songs written by K. C. Porter
Pop ballads
1995 songs
Columbia Records singles